The team dressage was an equestrian event held as part of the Equestrian at the 1964 Summer Olympics programme.  The event was held on 22 October, and consisted merely of summing the scores of the team's 3 horse and rider pairs in the individual dressage event.

Medalists

Results

References

Sources
 

Equestrian at the 1964 Summer Olympics